Visa requirements for Chinese citizens are administrative entry restrictions imposed on citizens of China by the authorities of other states.

 Chinese citizens had visa-free or visa on arrival access to 85 countries and territories, ranking the Chinese passport 59th in terms of travel freedom according to the Henley Passport Index.

Historical perspective
Before February 2014, Chinese immigration authorities did not generally allow mainland Chinese citizens to board outbound flights without having a valid visa for the destination country, even if the destination country granted a visa on arrival to Chinese passport holders, unless the exit was approved by the Ministry of Public Security. Exceptions were possible if the traveller had a third country's visa and a connecting flight from the initial destination country to the third country.  if the destination is a visa-on-arrival or e-visa issuing country this approval is no longer needed.

Visa requirements for Chinese citizens were lifted by Micronesia on 18 December 1980, the Bahamas on 12 February 2014, Indonesia in 2015, Grenada on 10 June 2015, Ecuador on 1 March 2016, Morocco on 1 June 2016, Tonga on 19 August 2016, Saint Kitts and Nevis on 1 January 2017, Serbia on 15 January 2017, Tunisia on 15 February 2017, Barbados on 1 June 2017, United Arab Emirates on 16 January 2018, Bosnia and Herzegovina on 29 May 2018, British Virgin Islands on 5 July 2018, St Lucia on 18 July 2018, Belarus on 10 August 2018, Qatar on 21 December 2018, Iran on 21 July 2019, Albania on 23 December 2019, Uzbekistan on 1 January 2020, Armenia on 19 January 2020, Oman on 16 December 2020, Suriname on 1 May 2021, Kazakhstan on 8 July 2022, Dominica on  September 19, 2022, Zambia on October 1, 2022, and Maldives on  February 17, 2023.

Visas on arrival were introduced by Azerbaijan on 1 February 2016, Brunei on 23 May 2016, Ukraine on 1 October 2016, Armenia on 10 November 2016, São Tomé and Príncipe on 5 April 2017, Qatar on 22 June 2017, Gabon on 12 October 2017, Bolivia on 27 December 2017, Rwanda on 1 January 2018, Benin on 15 March 2018, Zimbabwe on 1 July 2018, Myanmar on 1 October 2018, Sierra Leone on 5 July 2019, Saudi Arabia on 28 September 2019, and Iraq on 15 March 2021.

Chinese citizens were made eligible for eVisas by Lesotho on 1 May 2017, Djibouti on 18 February 2018, Oman on 7 May 2018, Uzbekistan on 15 July 2018, Pakistan on 14 March 2019, Saudi Arabia on 28 September 2019, South Africa on February 14, 2022  and Mongolia on April 27, 2022.

The country's passport index has constantly improved in the 00's decade from 42 in 2010 to 85 countries/territories in 2023, doubling its mobility access in 12 years. As shown before, more and more countries are lifting visa restrictions on Mainland China passport holders in recent years and there is a tendency for more countries to keep lifting restrictions as a way to pull the massive tourist market that Mainland Chinese tourists represent.

Visa requirements map

Hong Kong, Macau and Taiwan

Visa requirements

Dependent, disputed, or restricted territories
Unrecognized or partially recognized countries

Dependent and autonomous territories

Other Territories
. Ashmore and Cartier Islands - Special authorisation required.
. San Andrés and Leticia - Visitors arriving at Gustavo Rojas Pinilla International Airport and Alfredo Vásquez Cobo International Airport must buy tourist cards on arrival.
 Crimea - Visa issued by Russia is required.
.  Galápagos - Online pre-registration is required. Transit Control Card must also be obtained at the airport prior to departure.
 outside Asmara - To travel in the rest of the country, a Travel Permit for Foreigners is required (20 Eritrean nakfa).
. Lau Province - Special permission required.
  Mount Athos - Special permit required (4 days: 25 euro for Orthodox visitors, 35 euro for non-Orthodox visitors, 18 euro for students). There is a visitors' quota: maximum 100 Orthodox and 10 non-Orthodox per day and women are not allowed.
. Prior approval from the MHA required for whole of Arunachal Pradesh, Nagaland, Manipur, Mizoram and Sikkim and parts of states Uttaranchal, Jammu and Kashmir, Rajasthan, Himachal Pradesh. Restricted Area Permit (RAP) required for all of Andaman and Nicobar Islands and parts of Sikkim. Some of these requirements are occasionally lifted for a year.
. Kish Island - Visa not required.
. Closed cities - Special permission required for the town of Baikonur and surrounding areas in Kyzylorda Oblast, and the town of Gvardeyskiy near Almaty.
.  Sabah and  Sarawak - Malaysian Visa/eNTRI required. These states have their own immigration authorities but same visa policies applies as West Malaysia. However a single entry Visa/eNTRI is valid for multiple entry/exit between the territories inside Malaysia.
 outside Malé - Permission required. Tourists are generally prohibited from visiting non-resort islands without the express permission of the Government of Maldives.
 outside Pyongyang - Special permit required. People are not allowed to leave the capital city, tourists can only leave the capital with a governmental tourist guide (no independent moving).
 - Several closed cities and regions in Russia require special authorization.
 Mecca and Medina - Special access required. Non-Muslims and those following the Ahmadiyya religious movement are strictly prohibited from entry.
. Darfur - Separate travel permit is required.
 outside Khartoum - All foreigners traveling more than 25 kilometers outside of Khartoum must obtain a travel permit.
. Gorno-Badakhshan Autonomous Province - OIVR permit required (15+5 Tajikistani Somoni) and another special permit (free of charge) is required for Lake Sarez.
. Closed cities - A special permit, issued prior to arrival by Ministry of Foreign Affairs, is required if visiting the following places: Atamurat, Cheleken, Dashoguz, Serakhs and Serhetabat.
. Closed city of Mercury, Nevada, United States - Special authorization is required for entry into Mercury.
. United States Minor Outlying Islands - Special permits required for Baker Island, Howland Island, Jarvis Island, Johnston Atoll, Kingman Reef, Midway Atoll, Palmyra Atoll and Wake Island.
. Margarita Island - Visa not required. All visitors are fingerprinted.
. Phú Quốc - Visa not required for 30 days.
 outside Sana’a or Aden - Special permission needed for travel outside Sana’a or Aden.
 UN Buffer Zone in Cyprus - Access Permit is required for travelling inside the zone, except Civil Use Areas.
 Korean Demilitarized Zone - Restricted area.
 UNDOF Zone and Ghajar - Restricted area.

Non-ordinary passports

Holders of Chinese diplomatic or service passports have visa-free access to additional countries.

APEC Business Travel Card

Holders of an APEC Business Travel Card (ABTC) travelling on business do not require a visa to the following countries:

1 – up to 90 days
2 – up to 60 days
3 – up to 59 days

The card must be used in conjunction with a passport and has the following advantages:
undertake legitimate business in participating economies
expedited border crossing in all member economies, including transitional members
expedited scheduling of visa interview (US)
The rule is not available among the CHN, HKG, TWN travellers on business.

Exit and Entry Permit

In addition to passports, Exit and Entry Permit were issued to citizens of the People's Republic of China for visiting certain land neighboring countries for trade, tourism purposes without a passport, and visa to the country of visiting and vice versa under the bilateral agreements. Such permit is issued by the police stations in the related the boder administrative divisions. By far, travelers from the administrative divisions that share borders with North Korea, Mongolia, Myanmar, Laos, Vietnam, India and Nepal could apply for the Exit-Entry Permit for crossing borders.

Non-visa restrictions

Foreign travel statistics

See also

 Visa policy of China
 Visa requirements for Chinese citizens of Hong Kong
 Visa requirements for Chinese citizens of Macau

References and Notes

Notes

China
Foreign relations of China